The 2016 Barbados FA Cup was the 106th edition of the top knockout tournament in Barbados. The tournament was won by Weymouth Wales who defeated Rendezvous in the championship match. It was Weymouth's fifth domestic cup title.

The tournament began with the opening round in 26 March 2016 and ended with the final on 12 June 2016.

Bracket

Results

First round

Quarterfinals

Semifinals

Final

See also 
2016 Barbados Premier Division

References 

2016
football